Ahmad Abdullah Hassan Gholoum (born 31 May 1980) is a Kuwaiti athlete specialising in the shot put. He won multiple medals on regional level.

His personal bests in the event are 19.18 metres outdoors (Amman 2007) and 19.08 metres indoors (Hangzhou 2012). The latter is the standing national record.

Competition record

References

1980 births
Living people
Kuwaiti male shot putters
Asian Games competitors for Kuwait
Athletes (track and field) at the 2002 Asian Games
Athletes (track and field) at the 2006 Asian Games
Athletes (track and field) at the 2014 Asian Games